The 1981 Virginia Cavaliers football team represented the University of Virginia during the 1981 NCAA Division I-A football season. The Cavaliers were led by sixth-year head coach Dick Bestwick and played their home games at Scott Stadium in Charlottesville, Virginia. They competed as members of the Atlantic Coast Conference, finishing in last. At the conclusion of a 1–10 campaign, Bestwick was fired. He had a record of 16–49–1 at Virginia.

Schedule

References

Virginia
Virginia Cavaliers football seasons
Virginia Cavaliers football